Skoal is a brand of smokeless tobacco. First produced by the U.S. Smokeless Tobacco Company (USSTC) in 1934, Skoal is considered a high-priced product within the dipping tobacco market. "Skoal" is an Anglicisation of skål, a term used often in Scandinavia to announce a toast of friendship, with connotations of well-wishing.

Nicotine level
A study conducted by scientists at R. J. Reynolds Tobacco Company using both the nicotine levels and free nicotine Levels in common tobacco brands produced in 2006 generated the following ranked results:

Advancements in measurement. Using another measurement criteria known as the free nicotine level, a level which is generated mathematically using the nicotine levels and the pH level of the tobacco brand, the results are ranked on the chart below:

Nicotine level rankings
The results of this 2006 study on traditional moist snuff's most common varieties in terms of nicotine level only, show that Timberwolf Long Cut Winter Green, at 14.1 mg, is the highest, Copenhagen Long Cut, at 13.9 mg, is the second highest, and Longhorn's Long Cut Winter Green, at 13.8 mg, is third highest. The study also shows Cooper's Long Cut Winter Green, at 8.0 mg, is the lowest, Kodiak Long Cut Winter Green, at 10.7 mg, is second lowest, and Copenhagen Pouches and Grizzly Long Cut Wintergreen, both at 11.2 mg, tie for third last.

Skoal ranking
Skoal, with a long cut range of 12.7 mg [tied for 11th strongest level, (Skoal Long Cut Cherry)], to a level of 13.4 mg of nicotine per gram of tobacco [tied for 4th strongest level, (Skoal Long Cut Straight)].

Free nicotine level rankings
However, in terms of the free nicotine level, it can be seen from the results that Kodiak Winter Green had the highest level at 8.2 mg, followed by Copenhagen Pouches at 6.8 mg, and Grizzly Long Cut Winter Green at 5.9 mg. The three lowest brands, were Cooper Long Cut Winter Green at 1.1 mg, Skoal Long Cut Cherry at 1.7 mg, and Kayak Long Cut Winter Green with a free nicotine level at 2.3 mg.
 
Skoal ranking. Skoal had a long cut free nicotine level range of 1.7 mg [tied for 16th strongest level, (Skoal Long Cut Cherry)] to 3.9 mg of free nicotine per gram of tobacco [tied for 8th strongest level (Skoal Long Cut Straight) and (Skoal Fine Cut Original)].

Mixed opinions on strength
From these results, it can be seen that Skoal ranks among the upper average in most varieties of its dipping tobacco. However, in the nicotine level chart, a measurement designed to read how much nicotine one actually receives while using the product, Skoal's varieties ranged from average (8th) to poor (2nd to last) depending on flavor and texture.

Cuts and flavors

Skoal is packaged in a 1.2 oz plastic can with a metal lid and is available in three textures: fine cut, long cut and two different pouch sizes. Fine cut is more grain-like, while long cut is more string-like. Two pouch varieties of Skoal are also available, Bandits, which are small pouches, and standard size pouches. The tobacco is sealed in a teabag-like pouch, eliminating the problem of tobacco spreading through the mouth. They are also easier to remove, since the tobacco stays in the pouch throughout use. Skoal Bandits are smaller, 1 gram pouches.  To compensate for the smaller portion of Bandits, tins of them contain 20 pouches, instead of the standard 15.

Skoal Original Fine Cut Wintergreen was originally sold in a fiberboard can with tin lid, just like Copenhagen, and was packaged in the plastic can with a tin lid. Skoal Long Cut has always been sold in a plastic can, and originally had a plastic lid as well.

The product originally produced was only available in wintergreen flavor, but other flavors have been made available:

Skoal X-tra was introduced in 2011 and has a bolder flavor and slightly more nicotine than regular Skoal. Skoal X-tra Crisp Blend and Rich Blend are two regular Skoal flavors fused together. Crisp Blend is a combination of Apple and Citrus, while Rich Blend is a combination of Cherry and Berry.

Skoal ReadyCut was introduced in late 2012. It is 15 pre-formed cubes of long cut tobacco which eliminate the need for packing the tin and are more convenient than traditional long cut. As of 2015, it had largely been removed from most markets, with showings only in a few states and online.

When Skoal Long Cut was introduced, the original four flavors were:
 Wintergreen
 Mint (introduced in 1985)
 Straight
 Classic
In 1993, two new flavors added to the line-up:
 Cherry
 Spearmint

Many more flavors and varieties were subsequently added.

Discontinued

History

1934: Skoal was introduced as a wintergreen-flavored smokeless tobacco.
1983: Skoal Bandits were released.
1984: Skoal Long Cut was released nationwide. It was introduced in four flavors: Wintergreen, Mint, Straight and Classic.
1989: Skoal Bandits were introduced to the UK, but banned by the government shortly afterwards amid widespread health concerns
2002: Skoal Berry Blend is introduced.
2003: Skoal Vanilla Blend is introduced. (Discontinued in 2011)
2004: Skoal Apple Blend is introduced.
2007: Skoal Citrus Blend is introduced.
2008: Skoal Edge, a bolder and cooler version of Skoal Long Cut Wintergreen, is introduced. (Discontinued in 2011)
2010: Skoal pouches were released.
2011: Skoal Snus was released.
2011: Skoal Xtra was released in pouches and longcut.
Early 2012: Skoal ReadyCut was released in a limited area. (Indiana, Florida, Kentucky and Virginia only)
Late 2012: Skoal ReadyCut was available across the United States.
2013: Skoal Xtra Mint Chill was released for trial in selected areas (Texas, South Carolina and Virginia only)
2013: Skoal ReadyCut discontinued.
Late 2015: Skoal Xtra Mint Chill discontinued
Mid-2016: Re-introduction of Skoal Apple, Berry, and Citrus pouches
Late 2018: Skoal Straight Classic Pouches discontinued

Popularity

IRI infoscan data for 2012 indicated that Skoal tobacco held a 22.5% share of the US smokeless tobacco market. There have been several songs written about Skoal or containing references to Skoal such as "Letter to Me" by Brad Paisley, "The Grundy County Spitting Incident" by Cledus T. Judd, "Guys Like Me" by Eric Church, "Beers Ago" by Toby Keith, and "Fancy Like" by Walker Hayes.

ReadyCut controversy
In late 2012, Skoal introduced their "ReadyCut" line.  ReadyCut was essentially the same as their previous tobacco offerings, with the primary difference being in the way in which it was presented in the can.  As opposed to pouches, or loose tobacco, ReadyCut was pressed into small bricks roughly one inch long, and half an inch square.  The premise behind this was that a user could get their average "pinch" without the need to pack the can, or spend too much time digging the tobacco out.  Furthermore, there would be less tobacco dropped, making the ReadyCut bricks cleaner.  Shortly after its introduction, however, many users began to complain that the number of bricks in the can did not equate the same amount of tobacco which the company claimed was packaged.  (Most cans have roughly one ounce of loose tobacco in them, while the average number of pouches per can is in the 15 to 20 range.) Users noted that if the bricks were broken apart and pressed around to form the usual loose tobacco, the can itself seemed half full; thus being less than the advertised one ounce.  As a result of this, and the perceived stigma associated with pouch use by regular users, ReadyCut sales quickly dwindled, to a point that by the end of 2013, Skoal had largely pulled ReadyCut from the market.

References

External links
Official website
Market information
Nicotine levels in American smokeless tobacco products

Chewing tobacco brands
Tobacco brands
Products introduced in 1934
IARC Group 1 carcinogens